José Alberto Valdivieso Tetamanti (21 June 1921 – 8 April 1996) was an Argentine defender which played for Atlético Madrid from 1945 to 1949.

Career
Born in San Martín, Mendoza, Valdvieso defended Atlético Madrid colours in four seasons, amassing 25 league caps, scoring twice. He was part of the squad that finished third in the 1946-47 La Liga, after being joint-first  all throughout the season. On the last day Athletic Bilbao draws three equal, Atletico loses 2-3  against Real Madrid, wasting a two-nill advantage, and Valencia wins six-nill against Sporting de Gijón, being proclaimed Champion. He did win some silverware at the Colchoneros, helping the club conquer the Copa Presidente de la Federación Española, against Valência on 14 September 1947.

After retiring in 1953, he moved to Portugal and joined Benfica as a youth coach, having two spells on the first team. He assumed the role for the first time on 4 January 1954, after Ribeiro dos Reis left the position, finishing the season in third place, behind both rivals. His second spell was on 19 June 1959, Valdevieso replaced Otto Glória for just one game, in a one-nill win against FC Porto on the 1959 Taça de Portugal Final.

He later moved to Australia, managing Canterbury in the suburbs of Sydney. In 1964 he led Deportivo Galicia in the Venezuelan Primera División to their first league title in 1964.

Managerial statistics

Honours
Benfica
Taça de Portugal: 1958-59

Deportivo Galicia
Venezuelan Primera División: 1964

References
General
 
 

Specific

External links 
 Profile at Infoatleti

Sportspeople from Mendoza Province
1921 births
Argentine footballers
Atlético Madrid footballers
Argentine football managers
S.L. Benfica managers
1996 deaths
Association football defenders
Argentine expatriate sportspeople in Spain